The Norwegian Savings Banks Association is the trade organization for savings banks in Norway.

It was founded in 1914 as Centralforeningen for Norges Sparebanker. Director since 2002 is Arne Hyttnes. The board currently consists of Stein Hannevik (chair), Liv Fiksdahl, Helge Roar Dalen, Finn Haugan, Elisabeth Johansen, Hilde Kraggerud, Anlaug Johansen, Olav Arne Fiskerstrand and Ivar Fjærtoft.

In 2010 it founded the cooperation organization Finance Norway together with the Norwegian Financial Services Association. Both organizations still exist, but not their respective "service offices", whose tasks were taken over by Finance Norway. The headquarters are in Oslo.

References

External links

Official site

Employers' organisations in Norway
Organizations established in 1914
Organisations based in Oslo
1914 establishments in Norway
Bankers associations